Neville Garrick is a Jamaican-born Los Angeles-based graphic artist, and photographer. He is a graduate of the University of California, Los Angeles (UCLA).

Garrick attended UCLA where he played for the football team, reaching the National Collegiate Athletic Association finals in both 1971 and 1972. After returning to Jamaica he became art director for the Daily News.

He is best known for creating the art work for many Bob Marley album covers, and designed the backdrops for the Reggae Sunsplash festival for much of the 1980s. Garrick has also worked with Burning Spear, Steel Pulse and many others.  He is the author of A Rasta's Pilgrimage: Ethiopian Faces and Places (1999).

Garrick was a founder and executive director of the Bob Marley Museum.

References

External links
  
 Interview at Eye Magazine

American photographers
American male writers
Living people
Jamaican emigrants to the United States
University of California, Los Angeles alumni
Year of birth missing (living people)